The South Bend Watch Company, a manufacturing company of pocket watches, was based in South Bend, Indiana.

History
The assets of the bankrupt Columbus Watch Company of Columbus, Ohio, were purchased by two brothers from South Bend, Indiana, in 1903. The brothers were sons of Studebaker Brothers Manufacturing Company co-founder Clement Studebaker. Clement Jr. was named president of the newly formed South Bend Watch Company. Along with George, Studebaker built a new factory in South Bend, Indiana, and hired 145 former Columbus employees, along with watchmaker Walter Cross Shelton, Sr., from the Appleton Watch Company in Wisconsin. The factory was outfitted with mass production machinery, the workers were retrained, and in 1905 production began.

Several styles of pocket watches were manufactured and sold at prices ranging from $16 to $125. The watches were well received and the company was a success. Watch production was interrupted during World War I, when the company was contracted by the government to build gun sights. By the time watch production resumed in 1918, the market had changed, with the wristwatch rapidly gaining popularity over the pocket watch. Regardless, the South Bend Watch Company prospered through the 1920s. 

The company introduced the Studebaker Watch, identical to the South Bend except for the name. It was sold by mail order and represented as being from the Studebaker Watch Company. Advertisements included the tagline "Directed by members of the Studebaker family – known for three-quarters of a century for fair dealing."

By 1929, the South Bend Watch Company had 300 employees and had produced nearly a million watches. The Studebaker line was sold on credit, requiring only one dollar down. When the stock market crashed on October 29, 1929, the company found itself with more delinquent accounts than it could handle. On November 27, 1929, the plant was closed. Employees were told it would remain closed until January 1, 1930. The plant never reopened. 

Liquidation was completed in 1933. Some 35,000 watches were in production when the factory closed. Shelton, along with two other employees, completed the assembly of those watches and sold them.  Shelton continued to operate the company's service department until his retirement in 1954 effectively ended the South Bend Watch Company story. The factory building, which had been used by a number of businesses over the years (including Kay Line Industries, a furniture manufacturer) was destroyed by fire in 1957.

Notes

References
StudebakerHistory.com - South Bend Watch Company
South Bend Watch Company

External links
StudebakerHistory.com

Defunct watchmaking companies
Studebaker
Defunct manufacturing companies based in Indiana